Gábor Simonfalvi (born 20 July 1987) is a Hungarian football player who plays for Zalaegerszegi TE.

References
Profile at HLSZ

1987 births
Living people
People from Dombóvár
Hungarian footballers
Association football defenders
Pécsi MFC players
Zalaegerszegi TE players
Nemzeti Bajnokság I players
Sportspeople from Tolna County